Oxynetra is a genus of firetips in the family Hesperiidae.

Species
Oxynetra confusa Staudinger, 1888 Argentina, Peru
Oxynetra hopfferi Staudinger, [1888] Panama
Oxynetra semihyalina C. & R. Felder, 1862 Peru

References

Natural History Museum Lepidoptera genus database

External links
images representing Oxynetra at Consortium for the Barcode of Life

Hesperiidae
Hesperiidae genera